Confessor is a Christian title.

Confessor may also refer to:

Confessor (band), a doom metal band
Confessor (novel), the eleventh novel in Terry Goodkind's Sword of Truth series
Confessor, a fictional occupation from The Sword of Truth series
 Confessor, a unit in Command & Conquer 3
 Itirafçı - former members of the PKK working with Turkish security forces (the word is often translated "confessor")

See also
 List of Confessors, a list of people with the Christian title Confessor of the Faith
 The Confessor (disambiguation)